Saaya  is a 2018 Pakistani horror drama television series directed by Syed Muhammad Khurram, produced by Babar Javed and written by Wajeeha Sahar. The drama stars Maham Amir, Sohail Sameer and Kiran Tabeer in lead roles, and premiered on Geo Entertainment. The theme of the series is karma.

In 2021, serial was released on the network's sister channel Geo Kahani. Its second season titled "Saaya 2" premiered on 6 May 2022, on Geo Entertainment. The second season stars Mashal Khan, Momina Iqbal and Danial Afzal Khan.

Plot
The drama revolves around a girl named Sauleha who lives with her husband Rashid and their daughters, but is pressed by her mother-in-law to produce a son otherwise she will be thrown out of the house. Sauleha delivers a baby boy but the boy gets exchanged for a girl by Qayyum in the hospital who is desperate to have a son. Sauleha's mother-in-law does not accept the baby girl and in order to get away from her presence she performs black magic which disturbs the mind of Sauleha. Her mother-in-law and sister-in-law murder her but pretend it is suicide. Rashid forcefully marries Saba but he doesn't accept her as a wife and this disturbs Saba. The family starts facing paranormal activities and the invisible presence kills a number of people. Meanwhile, the demon possesses Saba but Rashid thinks that she has a mental illness, and then  Sauleha's spirit continues to haunt Qayyum's house and is on a mission to avenge her killers.

Series Overview

Cast

Main Cast
Maham Amir as Sauleha 
Sohail Sameer as Rashid 
Kiran Tabeir as Saba 
Faizan Shaikh as Sajid 
Mizna Waqas as Raheela
Ghana Ali as Maheen

Recurring Cast
Sumbul Shahid as Ateeqa; Rashid, Sajid and Shela's mother
Hajra Khan as Shela; sister of Rashid and Sajid
Saleem Iqbal as Hamid; Rashid, Sajid and Shela's father
Saleem Mairaj as Shams; a spiritual scholar
Falaq Naz as Rafiqa; Saba's mother
Usman Patel as Ishaq; Saba's brother and Maheen's husband
Sana Pervaiz as Ghana; Saba's friend and Sajid's wife
Sana Humayun as Dr.Areesha
Wahaj Ahmed as Qayuum; Raheela's husband
Zulfikar Ali as Waseem; Shela's husband
Salma Qadir as Rifat; Shela's mother in law
Vasia Fatima

Child cast 

Khushi Maheen as Pinky(Rashid/Sauleha’ 2nd daughter
Bakhtawar Rasheed as Guriya(Rashid/Sauleha’s 1st daughter)
Anabia as Shafaq (Rashid/Sauleha’s 3rd daughter but actually this is Qayum/Raheela’s daughter 
Sameer as Ahsan (Shela/Waseem’s son)
 Sania Zehra as Laraib – (Qayum/Raheela’s 1st daughter)
Hoorain as Manahil (Qayum/Raheela’s 2nd daughter)
Alizay as Sidra (Qayum/Raheela’s 3rd daughter)
Akbar as Akbar (Qayum/Raheela’s 4th son who is actually Rashid/Sauleha’s son who the nurse swapped with their daughter)

Production
In September 2017, Syed Mohammad Khurram started shooting officially for his horror series "Jinn" which changed to "Saaya" afterwards. Faysal Manzoor headed the project whereas Wajiha Sehar written the script for the series. Shooting for the series started in September 2017 and it had to be launched in January 2018 but due to nikah of two stars of the series Maham Amir and Faizan Shaikh, shooting and editing was interrupted. Later it was launched in March 2018.

It was slated to go off air after 55 episodes but due to positive reviews and feedbacks, it was extended with new storyline which was produced by Erfan Ghanchi of Blue Eye Entertainment who previously produced Naagin. Lollywood actress Ghana Ali joined the cast on extension. The serial was concluded on 21 November 2018 with a two hour long episode.

Release
The series was announced to premiere on 7 March 2018 but was delayed due to editing issues and premiered on 21 March on Wednesday at 9:00 p.m. It airs thrice a week with the duration of one hour. The drama was previously titled as ‘Jin’ but changed afterward. During Ramadan, the channel reduced its running time to half an hour from 9:15 P.M to 9:50 P.M. From 20 June it returned to Wednesday to Friday at 9:00 p.m. with one-hour episodes, but after extension the show aired on Wednesday 9:00P.M due to delay in shooting issues. The series was among the top horror shows of 2018.

Sequel

In December 2021, it was revealed that season 2 of Saaya is in production starring Wajiha Khan Durrani, Mizna Waqas, Inaya Khan, Naveed Raza, Zainab Qayyum as initial cast members of the show. Later, Momina Iqbal, Mashal Khan were revealed as female leads. Sohail Sameer, Maham Aamir and Saleem Mairaj reprise their roles from the first season. It was released on 6 May 2022 on Geo Entertainment.

References

2018 Pakistani television series debuts
Horror drama television series
Pakistani horror fiction television series